Dominik Ivkič (born 31 July 1997) is a Slovenian football player who plays for Tallinna Kalev as a defender.

Club career

He made his professional debut in the Slovenian PrvaLiga for Domžale on 21 May 2016 in a game against Krško.

References

External links
 PrvaLiga profile 
 

1997 births
Living people
Slovenian footballers
Slovenia youth international footballers
Association football defenders
Slovenian PrvaLiga players
NK Domžale players
ND Ilirija 1911 players